The Mine is an American e-commerce company which sells home goods. Formerly known as ATG Stores, the company was founded in 1999 and now sells a variety of home items including furniture, lighting and home decor. The company's headquarters are currently in Kirkland, Washington and is owned by Lowe's Home Improvement.

History
ATG Stores was founded in 1999 with the launch of its first website, Lighting Universe, with the goal to consolidate lighting catalogs and pricing online for designers, homeowners and contractors. In 2000 LightingUniverse.com went live, and two years later ATG Stores launched FixtureUniverse.com, targeting plumbing fixtures and decorative bath products. In 2003 Allied Trade Group, Inc. was formed as the parent company of Lighting Universe and Fixture Universe with the goal to grow into a full line home furnishings supplier. ATG Stores added 50 stores in the beginning of 2008 and at one point encompassed around 500 websites in multiple home furnishing, utility and paraphernalia categories, specializing in product sales of a variety of brand name manufacturers.

ATG Stores opened their first brick and mortar showroom in May 2004 in Kirkland, Washington; and their second showroom was purchased from The Lighting Co in August 2004. There were as many as seven ATG retail showrooms, all of which have closed.

Lowe's Home Improvement acquired ATG Stores on December 29, 2011 with the intention of expanding the product variety available to Lowe's stores and Lowes.com while also bringing more traffic and credibility to ATG Stores as an online e-tailer. This initiated the closing of the ATG Stores retail showrooms in Washington state and allowed for Lowe's customers to purchase ATG Stores items in-store for pickup.

In April 2017, ATG Stores rebranded to The Mine, and added a personal concierge service to their online shopping offering.

The Mine has been on Inc. Magazine's fastest growing companies list twice. Once in 124th place in 2006 and once in 412th place in 2007. They have also received recognition by the Puget Sound Business Journal, in 2006 they were ranked #16 and in 2007 ranked #31 on their list of fastest growing companies in the Northwest.

References

External links
Official Website

Online retailers of the United States
Companies based in Kirkland, Washington
Retail companies established in 1999
Internet properties established in 1999
1999 establishments in Washington (state)